The 2019 Internationaux de Strasbourg was a professional tennis tournament played on clay courts. It was the 33rd edition of the tournament and part of the International-level tournament category of the 2019 WTA Tour. It took place at the Tennis Club de Strasbourg in Strasbourg, France, between 19 and 25 May 2019.

Points and prize money

Prize money

Singles main draw entrants

Seeds

 Rankings are as of May 13, 2019.

Other entrants
The following players received wildcards into the singles main draw:
  Amandine Hesse 
  Aryna Sabalenka 
  Harmony Tan

The following player received entry using a protected ranking into the main draw:
  Shelby Rogers

The following players received entry from the qualifying draw:
  Marie Benoît
  Han Xinyun
  Marta Kostyuk
  Astra Sharma
  Laura Siegemund
  Renata Zarazúa

The following player received entry as a lucky loser: 
  Diāna Marcinkēviča

Withdrawals
  Ashleigh Barty → replaced by  Diāna Marcinkēviča
  Mihaela Buzărnescu → replaced by  Zhu Lin
  Alizé Cornet → replaced by  Magda Linette
  Camila Giorgi → replaced by  Luksika Kumkhum
  Aleksandra Krunić → replaced by  Fiona Ferro
  Petra Martić → replaced by  Jessica Pegula
  Anastasia Pavlyuchenkova → replaced by  Shelby Rogers

Doubles main draw entrants

Seeds 

 1 Rankings as of May 13, 2019.

Other entrants 
The following pairs received a wildcard into the doubles main draw:
 Fiona Ferro /  Diane Parry
 Amandine Hesse /  Harmony Tan
The following pair received entry as alternates:
 Daria Gavrilova /  Ellen Perez

Withdrawals
Before the tournament
  Chan Hao-ching /  Latisha Chan (change of schedule)

Finals

Singles

  Dayana Yastremska def.  Caroline Garcia, 6–4, 5–7, 7–6(7–3)

Doubles

  Daria Gavrilova /  Ellen Perez def.  Duan Yingying /  Han Xinyun, 6–4, 6–3

References

 Official website

2019 WTA Tour
2019
2019 in French tennis
Internationaux de Strasbourg